A sleeve garter is a garter worn on the sleeve of a shirt. It came into wide use, especially in the US, in the latter half of the 19th century when men's ready-made shirts came in a single (extra long) sleeve length. Sleeve garters allow individuals to customize sleeve lengths and keep their cuffs from becoming soiled while working or at the correct length when worn under a jacket.

Use
While a century ago this item of clothing was something a man may have worn regardless of profession (with the possible exception of the wealthy or those too well-dressed to wear non-tailored shirts), today sleeve garters are usually seen in relation to one of the following contexts.

Music

According to jazz historian Al Rose, the popular image of an early 20th-century saloon pianist being flashily dressed with arm garters was inspired by the way Tony Jackson used to dress while performing.

Gambling
Today, sleeve garters are part of the costume of poker dealers and other card dealers in casinos. While this is widely understood to make it more difficult for the dealer to cheat by concealing a card in his sleeve, the sleeve garter is usually accompanied by a vest and bow tie (and sometimes a visor) suggesting that this usage, might hark back to late 19th and early 20th centuries fashion at least as much as it serves a real purpose.

Old West
The sleeve garter is often seen in modern depictions of the Old West, not only on musicians and gamblers but on the stereotypical well-dressed gunslinger. In this case, the suggestion may be that the sleeve garter facilitates freedom of movement and aids in gunslingers' ability to quick draw.

Today, the sleeve garter sometimes accessorizes the costumes of rodeo participants. A small ornamental plate called a "concho", typically depicting an Old West motif, may be attached to the garter.

Bookkeeping
Day Dreaming Bookkeeper, Norman Rockwell's 1924 illustration, shows an accountant wearing a vest, a visor, a bowtie and very narrow sleeve garters. While the fellow is probably meant to be seen as old-fashioned in his dress, the presence of sleeve garters in this picture may indicate that men who worked with papers and ink sometimes wore sleeve garters up until the second quarter of the 20th century.

See also
Suspenders

References

Armbands
Sleeves